Abdus Salek Choudhury (20 September 1947 - 19 November 1972) was a veteran of Bangladesh Liberation war. For his bravery in the war of independence, the government of Bangladesh awarded him the title of Bir Uttom. He held the rank of Captain during the war. He served as Commander of Sector-2.

Career 
In 1971, Chowdhury served in the Pakistan Army. At that time he was working in Dhaka cantonment. He was in Dhaka in March. He fled on 22 April and joined the Bangladesh Liberation war. Initially, he fought in Comilla under Khaled Musharraf (Bir Uttom). Later, when Salda sector was formed, he was appointed as the captain of Salda river sub-sector of sector two. When Khaled Musharraf was injured in October, Major Chowdhury became the commander of the Mukti Bahini 'K' Force.

At the end of September 1971, the entire area, including Nayanpur, near the Salda river railway station in Brahmanbaria district, was heavily defended by Pakistan Army. In September, Pakistani forces strengthened their defenses and the Mukti Bahini attacked led by Chowdhury. They were able to force the Pakistan Army to retreat. Chowdhury managed to attack the rear of the Pakistan Army with artillery support of the Indian Army.

Legacy 
On 11 February 2010, a book was published about his life titled "Major Abdus Salek Chowdhury and the Salda War".

References 

1946 births
1972 deaths
Recipients of the Bir Uttom
Bangladesh Army officers
People from Dhaka District
Mukti Bahini personnel